The Alplistock is a mountain of the Bernese Alps, located west of Handegg in the Bernese Oberland. It lies east of the Diamantstock, on the range between the valley of the Grueben Glacier and the Bächlital.

References

External links
 Alplistock on Hikr

Mountains of the Alps
Bernese Alps
Mountains of Switzerland
Mountains of the canton of Bern
Two-thousanders of Switzerland